The Technical University of Applied Sciences Würzburg-Schweinfurt (abbreviated: THWS) is a technical university in Germany, which was founded originally in 1807, and was restructured during 1971. The university is among the best applied sciences universities in Germany with over 150 partner universities worldwide. The university is located in Bavaria with campuses in Würzburg and Schweinfurt.

History

The history of today's University of Applied Sciences Würzburg-Schweinfurt dates back to 1807 and is linked with three previous institutions: the Balthasar-Neuman Polytechnic of the district of Lower Franconia, the Würzburg Commercial College and the Würzburg School of Applied Arts.

Following the passing of the Bavarian Technical University Law of 1970 (Bayerisches Fachhochschulgesetz or FHG), the current university opened its doors on 1. August 1971 with 1566 students and courses in seven subjects. The Würzburg campus offered courses in architecture, civil engineering, business administration and graphic design, while in Schweinfurt students could choose between electrical engineering, mechanical engineering and industrial engineering. 
In the following years new courses were added including social work (1972), plastics engineering (1973), computer science (1975), nursing management (1995), business economics (1998), Business informatics (2000), media management (2000), computational engineering (2003), logistics (2008) and robotics (2020).

Between 1991 and 2000 the university developed a new campus in Aschaffenburg, initially offering business economics and from 1997 electrical engineering. In 2000, this evolved into the independent University of Applied Sciences Aschaffenburg.

On 14. February 2003, the then minister of science, Hans Zehetmair, laid a foundation for a circular teaching building in Schweinfurt extending to 3000m² and costing almost 14.5 million euros. In the basement of the building there are modern student computer pool rooms. On the first floor a spacious assembly hall (Aula) offers a venue for events and conferences. arranged in a circle around the central space are deans' offices, administrative offices and the largest auditorium of the building. On the second and third floor of the building, constructed of reinforced concrete and aluminium, there are air-conditioned multimedia rooms. The building was opened by the minister of science, Thomas Goppel, on 4. October 2004. Since then, most of the courses in Schweinfurt have been held in these new premises. The older buildings in Schweinfurt have mostly been vacated and since 2004 been extensively refurbished.

In 2006, the naming rights for the biggest lecture hall of the university (located on the Würzburg campus) were acquired by Aldi-Süd. In the same year, Sparkasse Würzburg offered to sponsor another lecture hall. Within a short time the following companies were also sponsoring buildings which were named after them:
SALT Solutions (Würzburg)
Fränkische Rohrwerke Königsberg (Würzburg)
Fresenius Medical Care (Schweinfurt)
LEONI (Schweinfurt)
Warema-Renkhoff (Schweinfurt)

In 1 May 2011 the official name of the university became , and the official English name University of Applied Sciences Würzburg-Schweinfurt. However the logo with the abbreviation FH|W-S was still used.

In 2011 new buildings were acquired in both towns. In Würzburg, the new auditorium and laboratory building in Sanderheinrichsleitenweg was given to the university at the beginning of September 2011. In Schweinfurt, a new building located at Grüner Markt, opposite Kilianskirche was erected by the housing company Stadt- und Wohnbau GmbH (SWG). It cost about 9.6 million euro and the State of Bavaria has rented it from SWG for a minimum of 12 years. As second Schweinfurt campus, it accommodates 720 students in 7 auditoriums. It was officially opened on 10 August 2011.

On 1st January 2023, the university was accorded the status of a technical university.

Faculties 
There are ten faculties offering more than 40 bachelor's and master's degree programmes in the field of STEM (science, technology, engineering, mathematics), visual design, social sciences, language, and economy/business administration. Six of them are located only in the city of Würzburg, three of them only in the city of Schweinfurt. The Faculty of Applied Natural Sciences and Humanities is present at both study locations.

The University of Applied Sciences Würzburg-Schweinfurt is not only committed to a forward-looking, practice-oriented education, but it also attaches great importance to its faculties' modern equipment providing everything students need to successfully complete their respective degree programme.

Faculties in Schweinfurt 
 Applied Natural Sciences and Humanities
 Electrical Engineering
 Mechanical Engineering
 Business and Engineering
 Mechatronic Engineering
 Logistics
 Robotics engineering (October 2020)

Faculties in Würzburg 
 Applied Natural Sciences and Humanities
 Applied Social Sciences
 Architecture and Civil Engineering
 Visual Design
 Computer Science and Business Information Systems
 Plastics Engineering and Surveying
 Economics and Business Administration

Profile

The University of Applied Sciences Würzburg-Schweinfurt is the third largest university of applied sciences in Bavaria with 8654 students (winter semester 2011/12), over 200 lecturers (WS 2011/12), 20 lecturers with special tasks and 298 other members of staff.
Currently, the 10 faculties offer 30 courses finishing with a diploma, bachelor or master's degree.

The University of Applied Sciences Würzburg-Schweinfurt is a member of MedienCampus Bayern, the umbrella organization for media education in Bavaria.

Research & Established Institutes of Research 
The university has six interdisciplinary organised partly application-oriented research institutes, in which besides undergraduate especially graduate students find an ideal opportunity to practice "research on object".

I.A.L. (Institute Of Applied Logistics) 
The Institute for Applied Logistics ( IAL) as a research institute is a central scientific institution of the Würzburg-Schweinfurt University of Applied Sciences and was founded on 01.10.2006. Like the FHWS, the institute has locations in Würzburg and Schweinfurt.

In the IAL, all research activities of the University of Applied Sciences Würzburg-Schweinfurt in the field of logistics are bundled in an interdisciplinary manner. The basis for this is a flow-oriented understanding of logistics in terms of supply chain management.

Notable Sponsors 
 BVL - Confederation of Logistics (The logistics network for specialists and executives. Promotion of research and development projects in the field of logistics.)
 LRA - Logistics Research Austria (Cooperation Initiative of Austrian universities, colleges and non-university institutions for research and development in the fields of logistics, supply chain management and transport)
 Hans-Wilhelm Renkhoff Foundation (The Hans-Wilhelm Renkhoff Foundation was launched in 1995 by Hans-Wilhelm Renkhoff, founder of the group WAREMA. The foundation promotes both science, research and development as well as the practical and SME-related training of engineers and business economists at the FHWS.)
 Federal Ministry of Education and Research of Germany
 Association of the Logisticians

IDIS – Institute of Design and Information Systems 
The IDIS is an institution based at the Würzburg-Schweinfurt University of Applied Sciences, which deals with applied, interdisciplinary research and development in the field of digital information and communication media.

Notable Sponsors & Customers 
 Audi
 DATEV
 
 O2
 Schaffler

Technology Transfer Center for E-Mobility 
At the TTZ-EMO, more than 35 employees including students with six professors are currently researching and developing specific topics and issues relating to electrical energy technology, drive technology and electromobility. In addition to the Bad Neustadt location, they also use laboratories and institutes at the Schweinfurt location. The main topics are currently bundled in five scientific working groups: battery systems, power electronics, electrical machines, control engineering and electrical power engineering.

Notable Sponsors 
 Fraunhofer ISC
 Winora Group
 JOPP

IEHT - Institute for Power Engineering and High Voltage Technology at the Competence Centre Mainfranken 
The Institute for Power Engineering and High Voltage Technology (IEHT) was founded on 1 October 2011 at FHWS and forms part of the Competence Centre Mainfranken at the department in Schweinfurt. It serves as technological interface between the laboratories of the institute, the power engineering and high voltage technology laboratories of the faculties, the Technology Transfer Centre for E-mobility as well as external project partners.

Institute for Biomedical Engineering

IREM - Institute for Rescue, Emergency and Disaster Management 
The Institute for Rescue, Emergency and Disaster Management was founded in the summer semester of 2014 and is affiliated with the IAL, the second research-based institution of the faculty with the aim of transferring interdisciplinary knowledge into usable projects and products To raise college. Of particular importance in IREM is the integration of structures and experiences of members of public authorities and organizations with security tasks (BOS).

University Media Center (HMZ) 
The Hochschulmedienzentrum (HMZ) is a service provider in matters of media in the context of audiovisual productions, university projects, lectures and theses available to students and lecturers of all faculties. Like the library and IT service center, the HMZ is a central institution of the university.

Ranking

Library

The University Library is mainly used for study purposes by students from the two campuses of the university. However, the library is also open to the public. Its holdings are specialized on the range of subjects taught at the university, from social sciences through economics to engineering. The library is located in four buildings in Würzburg and one in Schweinfurt. Services include inter-library loans, work stations, computers, printing and photocopying.

Campus TV
Since 2007 the Bachelor students in Media Management have produced "Campus TV" in co-operation with TV Touring. As part of their course work, the students take responsibility for both content and technical aspects. The broadcasts focus on the life of the university and of the students. Broadcasts are every Tuesday at 18.30.

Awards & Membership 
 MINTernational Best Strategy Award
 National Code of Conduct for German Universities regarding international students
 National Association for College Admission Counseling

See also
 Fachhochschule

Gallery

References

Universities of Applied Sciences in Germany
Universities and colleges in Bavaria
University of Applied Sciences Würzburg-Schweinfurt
University of Applied Sciences Würzburg-Schweinfurt
1971 establishments in West Germany
Educational institutions established in 1971